The Field Museum of Natural History (FMNH), also known as The Field Museum, is a natural history museum in Chicago, Illinois, and is one of the largest such museums in the world. The museum is popular for the size and quality of its educational and scientific programs, and its extensive scientific-specimen and artifact collections. The permanent exhibitions, which attract up to two million visitors annually, include fossils, current cultures from around the world, and interactive programming demonstrating today's urgent conservation needs. The museum is named in honor of its first major benefactor, Marshall Field, the department-store magnate. The museum and its collections originated from the 1893 World's Columbian Exposition and the artifacts displayed at the fair.

The museum maintains a temporary exhibition program of traveling shows as well as in-house produced topical exhibitions. The professional staff maintains collections of over 24 million specimens and objects that provide the basis for the museum's scientific-research programs. These collections include the full range of existing biodiversity, gems, meteorites, fossils, and rich anthropological collections and cultural artifacts from around the globe. The museum's library, which contains over 275,000 books, journals, and photo archives focused on biological systematics, evolutionary biology, geology, archaeology, ethnology and material culture, supports the museum's academic-research faculty and exhibit development. The academic faculty and scientific staff engage in field expeditions, in biodiversity and cultural research on every continent, in local and foreign student training, and in stewardship of the rich specimen and artifact collections. They work in close collaboration with public programming exhibitions and education initiatives.

History

The Field Museum and its collections originated from the 1893 World's Columbian Exposition and the artifacts displayed at the fair. In order to house for future generations the exhibits and collections assembled for the Exposition, Edward Ayer convinced the merchant Marshall Field to fund the establishment of a museum. Originally titled the Columbian Museum of Chicago in honor of its origins, the Field Museum was incorporated by the State of Illinois on September 16, 1893, for the purpose of the "accumulation and dissemination of knowledge, and the preservation and exhibition of artifacts illustrating art, archaeology, science and history". The Columbian Museum of Chicago occupied the only building remaining from the World's Columbian Exposition in Jackson Park, the Palace of Fine Arts. It is now home to the Chicago Museum of Science and Industry.

In 1905, the museum's name was changed to Field Museum of Natural History to honor its first major benefactor and to reflect its focus on the natural sciences. During the period from 1943 to 1966, the museum was known as the Chicago Natural History Museum. In 1921, the Museum moved from its original location in Jackson Park to its present site on Chicago Park District property near downtown. By the late 1930s the Field had emerged as one of the three premier museums in the United States, the other two being the American Museum of Natural History in New York and the National Museum of Natural History at the Smithsonian Institution in Washington, DC.

The museum has maintained its reputation through continuous growth, expanding the scope of collections and its scientific research output, in addition to its award-winning exhibitions, outreach publications, and programs. The Field Museum is part of Chicago's lakefront Museum Campus that includes the John G. Shedd Aquarium and the Adler Planetarium.

In 2015, it was reported that an employee had defrauded the museum of $900,000 over a seven-year period to 2014.

Permanent exhibitions

Animal Halls 
Animal exhibitions and dioramas such as Nature Walk, Mammals of Asia, and Mammals of Africa that allow visitors an up-close look at the diverse habitats that animals inhabit. Most notably featured are the infamous man-eating lions of Tsavo. The Mfuwe man eating lion is also on display.

Evolving Planet 
Evolving Planet follows the evolution of life on Earth over 4 billion years. The exhibit showcases fossils of single-celled organisms, Permian synapsids, dinosaurs, extinct mammals, and early hominids. The Field Museum's non-mammalian synapsid collection consists of over 1100 catalogued specimens, including 46 holotypes. The collection of basal synapsids includes 29 holotypes of caseid, ophiacodontid, edaphosaurid, varanopid, and sphenacodontid species – approximately 88% of catalogued specimens.

Inside Ancient Egypt 
Inside Ancient Egypt offers a glimpse into what life was like for ancient Egyptians. Twenty-three human mummies are on display as well as many mummified animals. The exhibit features a three-story replica (featuring two authentic rooms with 5,000-year-old hieroglyphs) of the mastaba tomb of Unas-Ankh, the son of Unas (the last pharaoh of the Fifth Dynasty). Also displayed are an ancient marketplace showing artifacts of everyday life, a shrine to the cat goddess Bastet, and dioramas showing the afterlife preparation process for the dead.

The Ancient Americas 
The Ancient Americas displays 13,000 years of human ingenuity and achievement in the Western Hemisphere, where hundreds of diverse societies thrived long before the arrival of Europeans. In this large permanent exhibition visitors can learn the epic story of the peopling of these continents, from the Arctic to the tip of South America.

Cultural Halls 
Cultural exhibitions include sections on Tibet and China, where visitors can view traditional clothing. There is also an exhibit on life in Africa, where visitors can learn about the many different cultures on the continent, and an exhibit where visitors may "visit" several Pacific Islands. The museum houses an authentic 19th-century Māori Meeting House, Ruatepupuke II, from Tokomaru Bay, New Zealand.

Geology Halls 
The Grainger Hall of Gems consists of a large collection of diamonds and gems from around the world, and also includes a Louis Comfort Tiffany stained glass window. The Hall of Jades focuses on Chinese jade artifacts spanning 8,000 years. The Robert A. Pritzker Center for Meteoritics and Polar Studies contains a large collection of fossil meteorites.

Underground Adventure 
The Underground Adventure gives visitors a bug's-eye look at the world beneath their feet. Visitors can see what insects and soil look like from that size, while learning about the biodiversity of soil and the importance of healthy soil.

Working Laboratories
 DNA Discovery Center – Visitors can watch real scientists extract DNA from a variety of organisms. Museum goers can also speak to a live scientist through the glass every day and ask them any questions about DNA.
 McDonald's Fossil Prep Lab – The public can watch as paleontologists prepare real fossils for study.
 The Regenstein Pacific Conservation Laboratory –  conservation and collections facility. Visitors can watch as conservators work to preserve and study anthropological specimens from all over the world.

Sue, the Tyrannosaurus rex 

On May 17, 2000, the Field Museum unveiled Sue, the largest T. rex specimen discovered at the time. The specimen is estimated to be 67 million years old. The fossil was named after the person who discovered it, Sue Hendrickson, and is commonly referred to as female, although the dinosaur's actual sex is unknown. The original skull is not mounted to the body due to the difficulties in examining the specimen 13 feet off the ground, and for nominal aesthetic reasons (the replica does not require a steel support under the mandible). An examination of the bones revealed that Sue died at age 28, a record for the fossilized remains of a T. rex until Trix was found in 2013. In December 2018 after revisions of the skeletal assembly were made to reflect new concepts of Sue's structure, display of the skeleton was moved into a new suite in The Griffin Halls of Evolving Planet.

Scientific collections
Professionally managed and maintained specimen and artifact collections, such as those at the Field Museum of Natural History, are a major research resource for the national and international scientific community, supporting extensive research that tracks environmental changes, benefits homeland security, public health and safety, and serves taxonomy and systematics research. Many of Field Museum's collections rank among the top ten collections in the world, e.g., the bird skin collection ranks fourth worldwide; the mollusk collection is among the five largest in North America; the fish collection is ranked among the largest in the world.
The scientific collections of the Field Museum originate from the specimens and artifacts assembled between 1891 and 1893 for the World Columbian Exposition. Already at its founding, the Field Museum had a large anthropological collection.
A large number of the early natural history specimens were purchased from Ward's Natural History Establishment in Rochester, New York. An extensive acquisition program, including large expeditions conducted by the museum's curatorial staff resulted in substantial collection growth. During the first 50 years of the museum's existence, over 440 Field Museum expeditions acquired specimens from all parts of the world.

In addition, material was added through purchase, such as H. N. Patterson's herbarium in 1900, and the Strecker butterfly collection in 1908.
Extensive specimen material and artifacts were given to the museum by collectors and donors, such as the Boone collection of over 3,500 East Asian artifacts, consisting of books, prints and various objects. In addition, "orphaned collections" were and are taken in from other institutions such as universities that change their academic programs away from collections-based research. For example, already beginning in 1907, Field Museum accepted substantial botanical specimen collections from universities such as University of Chicago, Northwestern University and University of Illinois at Chicago, into its herbarium. These specimens are maintained and continuously available for researchers worldwide. The Index Herbariorum code assigned to this botanic garden is F and it is used when citing housed specimens.  Targeted collecting in the US and abroad for research programs of the curatorial and collection staff continuously add high quality specimen material and artifacts; e.g., Dr. Robert Inger's collection of frogs from Borneo as part of his research into the ecology and biodiversity of the Indonesian fauna.
Collecting of specimens and acquisition of artifacts is nowadays subject to clearly spelled-out policies and standards, with the goal to acquire only materials and specimens for which the provenance can be established unambiguously. All collecting of biological specimens is subject to proper collecting and export permits; frequently, specimens are returned to their country of origin after study. Field Museum stands among the leading institutions developing such ethics standards and policies; Field Museum was an early adopter of voluntary repatriation practices of ethnological and archaeological artifacts.

Collection care and management
Field Museum collections are professionally managed by collection managers and conservators, who are highly skilled in preparation and preservation techniques. In fact, numerous maintenance and collection management tools were and are being advanced at Field Museum. For example, Carl Akeley's development of taxidermy excellence produced the first natural-looking mammal and bird specimens for exhibition as well as for study. Field Museum curators developed standards and best practices for the care of collections. Conservators at the Field Museum have made notable contributions to conservation science with methods of preservation of artifacts including the use of pheromone trapping for control of webbing clothes moths.
In a modern collections-bearing institution, the vast majority of the scientific specimens and artifact are stored in specially designed collection cabinets, placed in containers made of archival materials, with labels printed on acid-free paper, and specimens and artifact are stored away from natural light to avoid fading. Preservation fluids are continuously monitored and in many collections humidity and temperature are controlled to ensure the long-term preservation of the specimens and artifacts.

The Field Museum was an early adopter of positive-pressure based approaches to control of environment in display cases, using control modules for humidity control in several galleries where room-level humidification was not practical. The museum has also adopted a low-energy approach to maintain low humidity to prevent corrosion in archaeological metals using ultra-well-sealed barrier film micro-environments. Other notable contributions include methods for dyeing Japanese papers to color match restorations in organic substrates, the removal of display mounts from historic objects, testing of collections for residual heavy metal pesticides, presence of early plastics in collections, the effect of sulfurous products in display cases, and the use of light tubes in display cases.
Concordant with research developments, new collection types, such as frozen tissue collections, requiring new collecting and preservation techniques are added to the existing holdings.

Collection records

Collection management requires meticulous record keeping. Handwritten ledgers captured specimen and artifact data in the past. Field Museum was an early adopter of computerization of collection data beginning in the late 1970s.  Field Museum contributes its digitized collection data to a variety of online groups and platforms, such as: HerpNet, VertNet and Antweb, Global Biodiversity Information Facility or GBif, and others. All Field Museum collection databases are unified and currently maintained in KE EMu software system. The research value of digitized specimen data and georeferenced locality data is widely acknowledged, enabling analyses of distribution shifts due to climate changes, land use changes and others.

Collection use
During the World's Columbian Exposition, all acquired specimens and objects were on display; the purpose of the World's Fair was exhibition of these materials. By 1910, 20,000 shell specimens were on display, with an additional 15,000 "in storage".

In today's museum, only a small fraction of the specimens and artifacts are publicly displayed. The vast majority of specimens and artifacts are used by a wide range of people in the museum and around the world. Field Museum curatorial faculty and their graduate students and postdoctoral trainees use the collections in their research and in training e.g., in formal high school and undergraduate training programs. Researchers from all over the world can search online for particular specimens and request to borrow them, which are shipped routinely under defined and published loan policies, to ensure that the specimens remain in good condition. For example, in 2012, Field Museum's Zoology collection processed 419 specimen loans, shipping over 42,000 specimens to researchers, per its Annual Report.
The collection specimens are an important cornerstone of research infrastructure in that each specimen can be re-examined and with the advancement of analytic techniques, new data can be gleaned from specimens that may have been collected more than 150 years ago.

Library
The library at the Field Museum was organized in 1893 for the museum's scientific staff, visiting researchers, students, and members of the general public as a resource for research, exhibition development and educational programs. The 275,000 volumes of the Main Research Collections concentrate on biological systematics, environmental and evolutionary biology, anthropology, botany, geology, archaeology, museology and related subjects. The Field Museum Library includes the following collections:

Ayer collection
This private collection of Edward E. Ayer, the first president of the museum, contains virtually all the important works in the history of ornithology and is especially rich in color-illustrated works.

Laufer Collection
 
The working collection of Dr. Berthold Laufer, America's first sinologist and Curator of Anthropology until his death in 1934 consists of about 7,000 volumes in Chinese, Japanese, Tibetan, and numerous Western languages on anthropology, archaeology, religion, science, and travel.

Photo archives
The photo archives contain over 250,000 images in the areas of anthropology, botany, geology and zoology and documents the history and architecture of the museum, its exhibitions, staff and scientific expeditions. In 2008 two collections from the Photo Archives became available via the Illinois Digital Archives (IDA): The World's Columbian Exposition of 1893 and Urban Landscapes of Illinois. In April 2009, the Photo Archives became part of Flickr Commons.

Karl P. Schmidt Memorial Herpetological Library
 
The Karl P. Schmidt Memorial Herpetological Library, named for Karl Patterson Schmidt is a research library containing over 2,000 herpetological books and an extensive reprint collection.

John James Audubon's Birds of North America
The Field Museum's Double Elephant folio of Audubon's The Birds of America is one of only two known copies that were arranged in taxonomic order.  Additionally, it contains all 13 composite plates.  The Field's copy belonged to Audubon's family physician Dr. Benjamin Phillips.

Education and research

The Field Museum offers opportunities for informal and more structured public learning. Exhibitions remain the primary means of informal education, but throughout its history the Museum has supplemented this approach with innovative educational programs. The Harris Loan Program, for example, begun in 1912, reaches out to children in Chicago area schools, offering artifacts, specimens, audiovisual materials, and activity kits. The Department of Education, begun in 1922, offers classes, lectures, field trips, museum overnights and special events for families, adults and children. The Field has adopted production of the YouTube channel The Brain Scoop, hiring its host Emily Graslie full-time as 'Chief Curiosity Correspondent'.

The Museum's curatorial and scientific staff in the departments of Anthropology, Botany, Geology, and Zoology conducts basic research in systematic biology and anthropology, besides its responsibility for collections management, and educational programs. Since its founding the Field Museum has been an international leader in evolutionary biology and paleontology, and archaeology and ethnography. It has long maintained close links, including joint teaching, students, seminars, with the University of Chicago and the University of Illinois at Chicago. Professional symposia and lectures, like the annual A. Watson Armour III Spring Symposium, present scientific results to the international scientific community and the public at large.

Academic publication
The museum publishes four peer-reviewed monograph series issued under the collective title Fieldiana, devoted to anthropology, botany, geology and zoology.

See also

 Captain Marshall Field Expeditions
 List of most-visited museums in the United States
 List of museums and cultural institutions in Chicago

References

External links

The Field Museum at Google Cultural Institute
Field Museum photo archives

 
Museums in Chicago
Central Chicago
Natural history museums in Illinois
Dinosaur museums in the United States
Asian art museums in the United States
African art museums in the United States
Egyptological collections in the United States
Museums of ancient Rome in the United States
Paleontology in Illinois
Pre-Columbian art museums in the United States
Buildings and structures on the National Register of Historic Places in Chicago
Marshall Field's
Museums established in 1905
1905 establishments in Illinois
Association of Science-Technology Centers member institutions
Institutions accredited by the American Alliance of Museums
Greek Revival architecture in Illinois
Anthropology museums in the United States
Museum Campus
Science museums in Illinois